Gary Ronald Honey (born 26 July 1959 in Thomastown, Victoria) is a retired long jumper from Australia. He won a silver medal at the 1984 Olympics with a jump of 8.24 metres.

Career 
In addition, Honey won gold medals at the 1982 and 1986 Commonwealth Games. He participated in three Summer Olympics, starting in 1980. He was ranked number 2 in the World from 1984 to 1986. He was also ranked in the top 6 in the world  from 1981 to 1988. He was 10 times Australian Champion, and 11 times Victorian Champion. In 1988, Gary was the Team Captain for the Seoul Olympic Games.

Honey was inducted into the Sport Australia Hall of Fame in 2000.

Notes

References
 Profile
 

1959 births
Athletes (track and field) at the 1980 Summer Olympics
Athletes (track and field) at the 1984 Summer Olympics
Athletes (track and field) at the 1988 Summer Olympics
Athletes (track and field) at the 1982 Commonwealth Games
Athletes (track and field) at the 1986 Commonwealth Games
Athletes (track and field) at the 1990 Commonwealth Games
Commonwealth Games gold medallists for Australia
Australian male long jumpers
Living people
Olympic athletes of Australia
Athletes from Melbourne
Commonwealth Games medallists in athletics
People educated at Parade College
Sport Australia Hall of Fame inductees
Medalists at the 1984 Summer Olympics
Olympic silver medalists for Australia
Olympic silver medalists in athletics (track and field)
People from the City of Whittlesea
Sportsmen from Victoria (Australia)
Medallists at the 1982 Commonwealth Games
Medallists at the 1986 Commonwealth Games